Joseph-Henri Altès (18 January 1826 – 24 July 1895) was a 19th-century French flautist, composer and pedagogue.

Biography
Born in Rouen, Joseph-Henri Altès was the son of a soldier. Violinist and conductor Ernest Eugène Altès was his younger brother. He began studying the flute at the age of ten and enrolled in the Conservatoire de Paris in December 1840, where he studied in 1840-1842. 

Like his teacher, Jean-Louis Tulou, he played a flute with four valves and only later changed to a Theobald Boehm model. As early as 1841, in the competition of the Conservatory, he received a second prize and the following year a First Prize. From 1848 to 1872, he was first flautist at the Orchestre de l'Opéra national de Paris and in 1868 he was the successor of Louis Dorus as a flute teacher at the Conservatoire, where he remained until 1893. Among his pupils were Georges Barrère and Adolphe Hennebains.

Altès is the author of a method of flute, Célèbre méthode complète de flûte (1880) and left about 40 compositions, including six solos for the entrance competition at the Paris Conservatory and transcriptions or fantasies on opera themes.

Altès was a friend of the painter Edgar Degas, who depicted him in 1870 on the painting entitled  housed at the Musée d'Orsay.

He died in Paris. He was buried on the cimetière de Montmartre (33rd division) with his wife, the opera singer Émilie-Francisque Ribault.

References

Bibliography
  U. Pešek et Ž. Pešek, Flötenmusik aus drei Jahrhunderten (Kassel: Bärenreiter, 1990)
  A. Goldberg, Porträts und Biographien hervorragender Flöten-Virtuosen -Dilettanten und -Komponisten (Celle: Moeck, 1987 (reprint of 1906 original)
  Julia Soriano Rodríguez (ed.), Lexikon der Flöte (Laaber: Laaber-Verlag, 2009),

External links
 
 Biography of Joseph Henri Altes (1826-1899) 
 Altès, Portrait by Degas, 1868 (Metropolitan Museum of Art, New York)
 Portrait on Gallica

1826 births
1895 deaths
19th-century classical composers
Academic staff of the Conservatoire de Paris
Burials at Montmartre Cemetery
Conservatoire de Paris alumni
French classical flautists
French Romantic composers
Musicians from Rouen
20th-century flautists